Efetli may refer to:
Əfətli, Azerbaijan
Evoğlu, Agdam, Azerbaijan